Nippononebria altisierrae is a species of black colored ground beetle in the family Carabidae, A member of the subgenus Vancouveria. It is found in western North America.

References

Nebriinae